The 2018 London local elections took place in London on 3 May 2018 as part of wider local elections in England. All London borough councillor seats were up for election. Elections to the Corporation of London were held in 2017. Mayoral contests were also held in Hackney, Lewisham, Newham and Tower Hamlets. The previous London borough elections were in 2014.

The results saw the London Labour Party achieve their best result in over 45 years, winning 44% of the vote, 1,128 councillors and control of 21 councils. This represented the party's second-best result in a London local election, only surpassed slightly by its 1971 total. The London Conservatives, by contrast, lost 92 seats to finish with 508 councillors, its lowest-ever tally of seats in a London local election. However, it retained control of 7 councils, having lost two to the London Liberal Democrats. The party's vote share increased by 2%, but at 28.8%, it was still the second-worst popular vote total for the Conservatives in the history of the London Boroughs. The London Liberal Democrats made a recovery from their all-time low in the 2014 election, gaining 34 council seats and winning two councils from the Conservatives. Among the other parties, the London Green Party was the most successful, winning a total of 11 council seats, just below their all-time high of 12 in the 2006 election. Support for the UK Independence Party collapsed, with the party losing all of its seats and dropping from 9.5% of the vote to 0.9%. The only other parties to win seats were the People's Alliance of Tower Hamlets (1 seat) and the Harold Hill Independent Party (1 seat).

Eligibility to vote 
All registered electors (British, Irish, Commonwealth and European Union citizens) who are aged 18 or over on polling day were entitled to vote in the local elections. A person who has two homes (such as a university student having a term-time address and living at home during holidays) can register to vote at both addresses as long as they are not in the same electoral area, and can vote in the local elections for the two different local councils.

Results summary

†Due to boundary changes, the figures for seat losses/gains are notional changes calculated by the BBC, and do not match up precisely to the London-wide results in 2014.

Councils results

Control

Councillors 
The table below shows the number of councillors won by each party for each council in London. The shaded cells show the party or parties in each council's governing administration.

Mayoral elections
There were four mayoral elections.

Ward result maps

London-wide 
The map below shows the results for each ward across the whole of Greater London.

By borough

Opinion polling

Notes

References

Council elections in Greater London
2018 English local elections
Local elections
May 2018 events in the United Kingdom
 
2018